Mitragyna tubulosa is a tree species found in Peninsular India in the Western Ghats.

Gallery

References

External links

Naucleeae
Flora of India (region)